Bernard Sulzberger (born 5 December 1983) is an Australian former professional racing cyclist, who rode professionally between 2006 and 2016. He is the older brother of fellow professional racing cyclist Wesley Sulzberger.

Major results

2002
 1st Stage 2 Tour of Sunraysia
 2005
 1st Stage 8 Tour of Tasmania
 2nd Overall Tour of the Murray River
1st Stage 2
 2007
 3rd Overall Tour of Tasmania
 2008
 1st  Criterium, National Road Championships
 1st Overall Tour of Gippsland
1st Stage 1
 2009
 1st Overall Tour of Tasmania
1st Stage 9
 1st Overall International Cycling Classic
 1st Stage 5 Tour of Utah
 1st Stage 4 Geelong Bay Classic Series
 1st Stage 6 Tour of Atlanta
 1st Stage 6 Tour de Beauce
2010
 1st Stage 1 International Cycling Classic
 1st Stage 2 Joe Martin Stage Race
2011
 1st Stage 3 Jayco Bay Cycling Classic
 4th Road race, National Road Championships
2012
 1st Round 12, Tour Series, Stoke-on-Trent
2013
 1st Overall Tour de Taiwan
1st Points classification
 1st Stage 6 Tour of Tasmania
2014
 2nd Road race, Oceania Road Championships
 3rd Stan Siejka Launceston Cycling Classic

References

External links

1983 births
Australian male cyclists
Cyclists from Tasmania
Living people